The Winter War in popular culture has had a deep and wide influence in Finland and elsewhere. The Winter War began three months after World War II had started and had full media attention, as the other European fronts had a calm period.

Films and television 
The Soviet documentary film The Mannerheim Line (1940) presents the official view of the Winter War between Nazi-helping Soviets and the Finns, including its causes, denouement and outcome.

The play There Shall Be No Night (1940) by the American playwright Robert E. Sherwood was inspired by a moving Christmas 1939 broadcast to America by the war correspondent Bill White of CBS. The play was produced on Broadway in 1940 and won the 1941 Pulitzer Prize for Drama. 

The American film Ski Patrol (1940), made by the Hollywood master Milton Krasner, features a Finnish reserve unit defending the border from the Soviets. The film took great historical liberties in its storyline.

The Finnish movie Talvisota (1989) tells the story of a Finnish platoon of reservists from Kauhava that belonged to the 23rd Infantry Regiment, which was almost only of men from Southern Ostrobothnia.

The documentary Fire and Ice: The Winter War of Finland and Russia (2006) shows how the Winter War influenced World War II and how Finland mobilised against the world's largest military power.

In 2011, Philip Kaufman began filming HBO's Hemingway & Gellhorn (first airdate May 28, 2012), which features Martha Gellhorn (played by Nicole Kidman) reporting from Finland during The Winter War. Steven Wiig portrays Simo Häyhä, who led a group of Finnish soldiers to shelter.

Games 
In a 1992 column in Pelit, "Wexteen" (Jyrki J. J. Kasvi) lamented the difficulty of modelling the war in interactive entertainment. According to Wexteen, if the game mechanics are based on troop strengths, troops would march through Helsinki, and if it was based on historical events, they would March through Moscow.

In 1987, a turn-based strategy game, Talvisota, was released for MSX.

Literature  

At the end of, and for a year after, the Winter War, in 1940–1941, much literature was published in the Soviet Union. Books were very narrow by their military history and operations, but they had a strong political message. The overall campaign was disastrous and so literature found its pride in the details of battles and military heroes. For example, the breakthrough of the Mannerheim Line was represented as a "legendary" performance by the Red Army.

The boys' adventure story Biggles Sees It Through (1940) by W.E. Johns is set during the final stages of the war. Squadron Leader James Bigglesworth is allowed by the British government to go in a party of volunteers to "help the Finns in their struggle against Soviet aggression". They fly reconnaissance raids from a base at Oskar, in a Bristol Blenheim bomber, and encounter a Polish scientist with secret papers on new aircraft alloys, as well as von Stalhein, their old World War I enemy.

Phantom Patrol (1940) by Arthur Catherall, writing as AR Channel, is another boys' adventure story about a group of Boy Scouts in Finland during the Winter War that becomes involved in guerilla activity for the Finnish forces.

Music 
Already during the war, in February 1940, Trinidadian calypso musician Atilla the Hun recorded a song, Finland and urged Finland, "Defeat the aims of Soviet Russia".

See also 
Winter in Wartime
 World War II in popular culture

References 

 
Winter War
Cultural history of World War II
World War II and the media